Halfway House Outlier is a small, twelve-room, one-story Ancestral Puebloan great house and archeological site located in New Mexico, United States. It lies halfway between Chaco Canyon and Salmon Ruins, on the Great North Road. Halfway House appears to have been built in relation to the road, and was probably an orientation point used during the road's construction.

References

Bibliography

Archaeological sites in New Mexico
Chaco Canyon
Chaco Culture National Historical Park
Colorado Plateau
Ancestral Puebloans
Post-Archaic period in North America
Native American history of New Mexico